Sinbad and the Caliph of Baghdad (Italian: Simbad e il califfo di Bagdad) is a 1973 Italian adventure film directed by Pietro Francisci and starring Robert Malcolm, Sonia Wilson, Luigi Bonos and Arturo Dominici Based on the legend of Sinbad, it was the director Francisci's final film. 

It was shot at the Elios Studios in Rome and on location in Egypt. The soundtrack features music from Nikolai Rimsky-Korsakov's Scheherazade.

Cast
 Robert Malcolm as Simbad / Shariar
 Sonia Wilson as Sherazade
 Luigi Bonos as Firùz
 Leo Valeriano as Bamàn
 Spartaco Conversi as Hassem
 Arturo Dominici as Visir
 Franco Fantasia as Il comandante delle guardie
 Eugene Walter as Zenebi
 Paul Oxon as Il capitano della nave

References

Bibliography
 Moliterno, Gino. The A to Z of Italian Cinema. Scarecrow Press, 2009.

External links 
 

1973 films
Italian adventure films
1970s adventure films
1970s Italian-language films
Films directed by Pietro Francisci
Titanus films
Films set in Baghdad
Films shot in Egypt
Films based on Sinbad the Sailor
1970s Italian films